This is a timeline of women's suffrage in Ohio. Women's suffrage activism in Ohio began in earnest around the 1850s, when several women's rights conventions took place around the state. The Ohio Women's Convention was very influential on the topic of women's suffrage, and the second Ohio Women's Convention in Akron, Ohio, featured Sojourner Truth and her famous speech, Ain't I a Woman? Women worked to create organizations and groups to influence politicians on women's suffrage. Several state constitutional amendments for women's suffrage did not pass. However, women in Ohio did get the right to vote in school board elections and in some municipalities before Ohio became the fifth state to ratify the Nineteenth Amendment.

19th century

1800s 
1802

 November: The Ohio Constitutional Convention votes to provide suffrage in the state to only white men. Ohio becomes the second state to restrict voting by race in their constitution.

1850s 
1850

 April: The first convention of women's rights held outside of New York took place. The Ohio Women's Convention had an attendance of 500 people.
 May 6: A state Constitutional Convention is convened in Columbus. A proposal to remove both "white" and "male" from the legal description of a voter in the constitution fails by a large margin.

1851

 The Ohio Women's Convention in Akron, Ohio had Sojourner Truth as a speaker on African-American women and equality.
1852
 The Ohio Women's Convention in Massillon, Ohio established the Ohio Women's Rights Association (OWRA).

1853

 October 5: The National Women's Rights Convention is held in Cleveland.
 May 25: First meeting of the Ohio Women's Rights Association (OWRA) takes place in Ravenna, Ohio.

1854

 Caroline Severance, president of the Ohio Women's Rights Association (OWRA) reads a petition for women's rights to the Ohio Senate.

1855

 October 18: The National Women's Rights Convention is held in Cincinnati.

1860s 
1867

 Susan B. Anthony, Elizabeth Cady Stanton, Lucy Stone and George Francis Train campaign for women's suffrage in Ohio, starting in Cleveland.

1869

 The American Woman Suffrage Association (AWSA) is established in Cleveland.
 November 24–25: AWSA holds its first convention in Cleveland.
 The Toledo Women's Suffrage Association (TWSA) is created.
 The Dayton Woman's Suffrage Association (DWSA) is formed.

1870s 
1871

 DWSA disbands.
1873

 A women's suffrage petition is presented at the Ohio Constitutional Convention. Proposals for women's suffrage fail at the convention.

1874

 The Women's Christian Temperance Union (WCTU) is founded in Cleveland.
1876

 The Toledo Woman Suffrage Association (TWSA) refuses to participate in a Fourth of July celebration saying, "We feel it inconsistent as a disfranchised class to unite with you in the celebration of that liberty which is the heritage of but half the people."

1880s 

1880

 Susan B. Anthony attends the Democratic National Convention in Cincinnati.
1884

 A small suffrage convention takes place in Columbus.

1885

 The Ohio Woman Suffrage Association (OWSA) is founded in Painesville, Ohio.
1888

 Louisa Southworth of Cleveland starts enrolling the names of people from Ohio endorsing women's suffrage in order to counter the narrative that women don't want to vote.
 Two referendum for full and municipal women's suffrage were introduced in the Ohio Legislature, but both fail.
1889

 Another bill for full suffrage is introduced in the Ohio Senate, but does not make a required three-fifths majority to pass.

1890s 
1891

 Suffragists petition the Ohio Legislature, but no bills for women's suffrage are introduced.

1892

 A bill for women's suffrage in school board elections is introduced in the Ohio House by E. W. Doty. It does not pass.

1893

 Another bill for school board suffrage is introduced, but does not pass.

1894

 January: Gustavus A. Wood introduces another school board suffrage bill in the House, but it is narrowly defeated.
 April 10: A similar school board suffrage bill is introduced in the Ohio Senate by William T. Clark and it passes by a large measure.
 April 24: The Senate bill is turned over to the House where it passes.
 Law passed in Ohio to allow women to vote in school board elections and also to run for office in the school board.
 December: Ida M. Earnhart in Columbus is one of the first women to register to vote in the next school election.
1895

 January: A suit is filed against Earnhart and the board of elections to strike her name from the list of voters. It is argued in the Franklin County Circuit Court in January.
 February 1: The Franklin County Circuit Court declares that the law allowing women to vote in school board elections is constitutional.
 Women vote in their first school board elections.

1896

 Henrietta G. Moore of Springfield, Ohio and Laura A. Gregg from Kansas travel Ohio on behalf of OWSA to help set up additional local groups.

1897

 A suffrage conference is held in the Fall in Toledo.

1898

 February 10: An amendment introduced by A. J. Hazlett in the Ohio House to repeal school board suffrage is defeated by 76 against and 22 for.
 April: The National Woman Suffrage Conference is held in Cincinnati.
 May: The fifth annual Ohio Women Suffrage Convention takes place in Akron. Speakers include Susan B. Anthony, Anna Howard Shaw and Zerelda G. Wallace.

1899

 Harriet Taylor Upton becomes president of OWSA.

20th century

1900s 
1900

 Harriet Taylor Upton visits "fifteen principal towns" in Ohio to help set up organized suffrage groups. By the end of the year, she had doubled organized suffrage participation.
 January: The Ohio Legislature considers an equal suffrage bill.

1903

 The National American Woman Suffrage Association (NAWSA) headquarters is moved to Warren, Ohio.

1910s 
1910

 NAWSA headquarters is moved from Warren.

1911

 June: Elizabeth Hauser organizes a suffrage rally at Cedar Point. Speakers include Harriet Taylor Upton and Newton D. Baker.
 October: The Ohio Women's Suffrage Association (OWSA) holds their annual convention in Dayton with Anna Howard Shaw as a featured speaker.

1912

 January 18: Dora Bachman of Cincinnati presents a women's suffrage amendment proposal to the Ohio Constitutional Convention's committee.
 A women's suffrage voter referendum for an amendment to the Ohio Constitution is on the ballot.
 August 27: OWSA organizes a suffrage parade in Columbus. Around 5,000 women attend the parade.
 September 3: The 1912 Ohio suffrage amendment does not pass.
 A law is passed in Ohio allowing individual municipalities to choose if they wished to grant women's suffrage within their city.
 An umbrella group, the Franklin County Women's Suffrage Association (FCWSA) is formed.
 The Woman's Suffrage Party of Montgomery County is formed.
 The Lima Federation of Women's Clubs invites Emmeline Pankhurst to speak in Lima, Ohio.
 Cornelia Cassady Davis wins the prize for "best suffrage poster" from OWSA for her "Let Ohio Women Vote" image.
 The Shelby Equal Franchise Association is formed in Shelby, Ohio and was part of the local WCTU.
1914

 January: The Socialist Party and Progressive Party in Ohio came out in support of women's suffrage.
 May 9: Preachers who were members of the Ministerial Association of Columbus preached on Mother's Day how giving women the vote would help them "better fulfill their maternal duties."
 October: Carrie Chapman Catt and Harriet Taylor Upton came to speak in Lima, Ohio. A parade was held that drew more than 1,500 people in support of women's suffrage.
 October: Suffragists in Cleveland held a parade that drew more than 10,000 women and 400 men marching and riding on horseback.
 November 3: The 2nd Ohio women's suffrage amendment is rejected.
1915

 The Ohio Woman Suffrage Association (OWSA) invites NAWSA and the Congressional Union (CU) to set up offices in Ohio.

1916

 June 6: The Municipal Suffrage Amendment in East Cleveland passes with 426 votes, allowing women to vote in city elections.

1917

February: Representative from Cuyahoga County, James A. Reynolds introduces a bill into the Ohio legislature for women to vote in presidential elections.
February 21: Governor James M. Cox signs the "Reynolds Bill," granting women the right to vote in presidential elections.
Lakewood, Ohio passes municipal suffrage measures for women.
 Challenges to municipal suffrage are rejected by the Ohio Supreme Court.
November 6: A voter referendum rejects the "Reynolds Bill."

1919

June 16: Ohio ratifies the Nineteenth Amendment. It is the fifth state to ratify the amendment.
 The Colored Women's Republican Club changes their name to the Colored Women's Independent Political League.

1920s 
1920

 April 23: Hawke v. the Secretary of the State of Ohio decides that a federal amendment to the U.S. Constitution does not have to be decided by direct voter referendum, which ended a problem Tennessee had with ratifying the 19th Amendment.
 April: The Cuyahoga County Woman's Suffrage Party dissolves and reforms as the League of Women Voters of Cleveland.
 September: The Political Equality Club of Lima dissolves and creates the Lima League of Women Voters.
1923

 A voter referendum passes to remove the phrase "white male" from the description of a voter in the Ohio Constitution.

See also 

 List of Ohio suffragists
 Women's suffrage in Ohio
 Women's suffrage in states of the United States
 Women's suffrage in the United States

References

Sources 

 
 
 
 
 
 
 

Ohio suffrage
Timelines of states of the United States
Suffrage referendums